Eduard Kuznetsov may refer to:

 Eduard Kuznetsov (dissident) (born 1939), Soviet dissident, human rights activist
 Eduard Kuznetsov (politician) (born 1967), Russian politician

  (1928—2007), Soviet test pilot, Hero of the Soviet Union